Harry Yven (24 April 1912 – 24 February 1988) was a Norwegian footballer. He played in three matches for the Norway national football team from 1931 to 1948.

References

External links
 

1912 births
1988 deaths
Norwegian footballers
Norway international footballers
Association footballers not categorized by position